Šalinci is a settlement in the Municipality of Ljutomer in northeastern Slovenia. The area belongs to the traditional region of Styria and is now included in the Mura Statistical Region.

References

External links
Šalinci on Geopedia

Populated places in the Municipality of Ljutomer